Looptroop Rockers is a hip hop group from Västerås, Sweden. The members are rappers Promoe (Mårten Edh), Supreme (Mathias Lundh-Isen), DJ/Producer Embee (Magnus Bergkvist) and CosM.I.C (Tommy Isacsson). On their fourth album, Good Things,  the group changed its name from Looptroop to Looptroop Rockers, a name used unofficially for some years prior to the change.

Biography
Looptroop was formed in 1991 by Promoe and Embee. The two had met while attending school in Västerås and were still in their teens at the time of the group's inception. Cos.M.I.C joined shortly thereafter and in 1993 the group independently released their cassette-only debut EP Superstars, which was followed in 1995 by Threesicksteez. By the time they released their third cassette, From The Wax Cabinet (1996), long-time associate and frequent collaborator Supreme had become a permanent member of the group. It was in the pre-DVSG time when Promoe and Cos.M.I.C were also part of a group of graffiti writers called the "BIF" (Babylon Is Falling) crew in Västerås.

In 1998, Looptroop started their own record label, David Vs. Goliath (commonly referred to as DVSG), and with distribution handled by the Swedish punk rock label Burning Heart Records they released their full-length debut album Modern Day City Symphony in 2000. The album managed to sell reasonably well despite limited media exposure and spawned the underground hit single "Long Arm of the Law," which took a critical stance towards the Swedish police force and has since become one of Looptroop's signature songs.

In 2001, Promoe became the first member of the group to launch a solo career, with his debut solo album, Government Music. In 2002 Looptroop released their second album The Struggle Continues.

Embee's solo album Tellings From Solitaria was released in 2004 and featured contributions from several notable Swedish artists, including José González, Timbuktu and Daniel Lemma. The album was critically acclaimed and won a Swedish Grammy Award for best hiphop/soul in 2004.

Their third full-length studio album, Fort Europa, was released in 2005.  On the track "Fort Europa," the group takes a particularly critical tone towards their country's immigration policy.  In the video, an image of a TV screen reading "Welcome SWE" is smashed by a golf club as the beat drops.  In the first verse, Promoe compares immigration policy to the Berlin Wall.

On February 9, 2007 Cos.M.I.C announced that he was leaving the group indefinitely. He stated that there had been no falling-out between him and the rest of the group and mentioned that the group's busy schedule, which prevented him from spending time with his family, prompted this decision. Cos.M.I.C then contributed to two songs on the group's 2008 album "Good Things". After Cos.M.I.C left the group, they have also officially changed the group name from Looptroop to Looptroop Rockers!

Looptroop Rockers released their fourth album Good Things on 23 April 2008. Cos.M.I.C is featured on one of the tracks on the album. 2008 was also the year that DVSG was celebrating its 10th anniversary. Looptroop Rockers worked with artists like Rakaa Iriscience of the Dilated Peoples, CunninLynguists, Timbuktu and Adam Tensta for this album.

On 21 May 2010 Looptroop Rockers announced on their website that they were working on a new album.  Promoe said it to be slated for a February 2011 release at a gig in Helsinki on May 19. On the same occasion it was announced that Cos.M.I.C. rejoined the group as a full member working on the new album.

In March 2011, the group released their fifth album "Professional Dreamers".

2013 saw the release of their first album in Swedish, "Mitt hjärta är en bomb". Made available on both CD and Vinyl LP.

In late October 2014, Looptroop Rockers released their album "Naked Swedes" on CD, LP and digital formats. It features guest appearances by Cunninglynguists,  Seinabo Sey and Sabina Ddumba. Lord Finesse produced an exclusive remix for the first single from the album, "Another Love Song".

In 2017 Looptroop Rockers was inducted into the Swedish Music Hall of Fame.

To celebrate 25 years as a band, Looptroop Rockers released 25 new songs in 25 weeks during 2017.

Discography

Main Albums
Looptroop

Looptroop Rockers

EPs
1996: From the Wax Cabinet EP
1996: Fuck A Record Deal (Looptroop/Headtag)
1997: Unsigned Hype
1998: From Beyond K-line (with Kashal Tee & Dj Erase)
1998: Heads or Tails EP
1998: Schlook From Birth
2000: Sedlighetsroteln

Singles
2005: "Fort Europa"/"Looptroop Radio" (Reached number 33 in Swedish Singles Chart)
2008: "Naive" (with Timbuktu) 
2011: "Professional Dreamers"
2014: "Another Love Song" b/w "Beautiful Mistake" (with remix by Lord Finesse) 
2014: "Slippin´"b/w "We Got Guns"

12" vinyl
1999: "Ambush in the Night"
2000: "Long Arm of the Law"
2002; "Fly Away"
2002: "Looptroopland"
2003: "Don't Hate the Player"
2005: "Fort Europa"
2008: "The Building"
2014: "Another Love Song" b/w "Beautiful Mistake" (with remix by Lord Finesse)

Solo Albums and Side Projects
Promoe
1999: Off the Record (single) b/w It's Promoe/Poor Lonesome Homeboy
2001: Government Music
2004: The Long Distance Runner 
2006: White Man's Burden 
2007: Standard Bearer
2009: Kråksången
2009: Bondfångeri
2010: Never Follow [EP] 
Embee
1998: From the Way Beyond Mixtape
2000: Embeetious Art EP
2004: Tellings From Solitaria
2006: Mash Hits 
2010: The Mellow Turning Moment
2015: Mellan passion & mani
2016: Fult folk

The Casual Brothers (Embee and Cos.M.I.C)
2001: The Casual Brothers
2003: Customer's Choice

See also
Swedish hip hop
Hip hop music

References

External links 
 
Looptroop Rockers On Reapet Album:Professional Dreamers 2011

 

Looptroop
Burning Heart Records artists